A Tiny Audience is an American music series produced by February Entertainment for HBO Latino. Musical artists are interviewed and perform in front of a small group of fans. The series is hosted by musicians Sarah Packiam, Daniel René, Maria Elisa Ayerbe (season 2), and Brenda Bonnie (season 1). The series began in 2019, and a second season debuted in March 2021.

Artists 

 Ally Brooke
 Cabas
 Pedro Capó
 Cami
 Jackie Cruz
 Fonseca
 Kany García
 Vicente García
 Greeicy
 Alejandra Guzmán
 Lauren Jauregui
 Natalia Jiménez
 Jesse & Joy
 Juanes
 La Santa Cecilia
 Mon Laferte
 Los Amigos Invisibles
 Lunay
 Gian Marco
 Nacho
 Natti Natasha
 Debi Nova
 Danny Ocean
 Piso 21
 Ivy Queen
 Justin Quiles
 Mau y Ricky
 MDO
 Carlos Rivera
 Draco Rosa
 Paulina Rubio
 Sech
 Diego Torres
 Tommy Torres
 Manuel Turizo
 Carlos Vives
 Sebastián Yatra
 Becky G
 Jay Wheeler
 Leslie Grace
 Zion & Lennox
 Guaynaa
 Jessie Reyez
 Danna Paola
 Mike Bahía
 Justin Quiles
 La India
 Carla Morrison
 Manuel Medrano
 Aleks Syntek
 Ximena Sariñana
 Cimafunk
 Silvestre Dangond
 Jon Secada
 Robin Thicke

References

External links 
 
 

English-language television shows
2019 American television series debuts
2010s American music television series
2020s American music television series
HBO original programming